Erzsébet Rákóczi (1655–1707), was a Hungarian countess and poet.

She was the daughter of the judge Paul Rákóczi. In 1669 she married count Erdödy Adam and in 1672 she married count György Erdödy. In the 1670s, she possibly had an affair with her friend, Paul Esterhazy. In 1685, she and her spouse had a crisis in their marriage which attracted wide attention and was the subject for court proceedings. Officially reconciled, they lived separated since then: she at her estate in Croatia, and he in Vienna.

Erzsébet Rákóczi is known for her love poems and for the letters from her correspondence with her spouse from 1672–1707, which are regarded as important historic documents.Those love letters were published in 2001. Also, she had an art collection, but after her death it was dispersal between several aristocratics collectors.

Notes

17th-century Hungarian people
1655 births
1707 deaths
17th-century Hungarian women writers
17th-century writers
Hungarian nobility
Erzsebet